Modern Vintage is the third studio album by American rock band Sixx:A.M.

Modern Vintage peaked at number 20 on the Billboard 200 on October 25, 2014. It topped the Billboard Hard Rock Charts, and reached number 5 on the Billboard Rock charts.

Background

About the album, vocalist James Michael stated "It was exciting for us, because this is the first record where we didn't have an outside, kind of, peripheral thing, like a book or photography, to base it on. And we did that very intentionally... We wanted to find out who we had become as a band, and in order to do that, what we did is we went back and looked at all of the records that had inspired us over the years — Queen, ELO, Elton John, and Bowie and all of those artists. And when you look at their careers, they were all very song-based; all of those records were very song-based, very performance-based. And that's the spirit in which we wanted 'Modern Vintage' to be made."

Reception

In a positive review, Stephen Thomas Erlewine of Allmusic stated "The versatility of Modern Vintage -- it's undeniably anchored in classic hard rock sounds but feels restless in its cage -- is also a tip-off that Nikki Sixx is now pouring his creative energies into this band, not Mötley Crüe.... that kinetic crack is why Modern Vintage packs a real kick.

Track listing

Charts

Credits
Nikki Sixx – bass guitar, backing vocals
DJ Ashba – lead guitar, backing vocals
James Michael – lead vocals, rhythm guitar, piano
 Jeff Fabb – drums

References

2014 albums
Eleven Seven Label Group albums
Sixx:A.M. albums